The European Women's Handball Championship is the official competition for senior women's national handball teams of Europe, and takes place every two years. In addition to crowning the European champions, the tournament also serves as a qualifying tournament for the Olympic Games and World Championship. As of December 2022, the only teams that have ever won the championship are Norway (nine times), Denmark (three times), Hungary, Montenegro and France (each once).

History
In year 1946, the International Handball Federation was founded by eight European nations, and though non-European nations competed at the World Championships, the medals had always been taken by European nations.  European Handball Federation is founded in 1991. At the same time (1995), the World Championship was changed from a quadrennial to a biannual event, and the European Handball Federation now began its own championship – which also acted as a regional qualifier for the World Championship. The tournament will be expanded to 24 teams in 2024 to take place in Austria, Hungary and Switzerland.

Tournaments

Medal table

Statistics

Summary (1994-2020)

Total hosts

Top scorers by tournament
The record-holder for scored goals in a single Euro Championship is Bojana Radulović, where she scored 72 goals Hungary at the 2004 European Women's Handball Championship in Hungary.

Best players by tournament

Participating nations

Most successful players
Boldface denotes active handball players and highest medal count among all players (including these who not included in these tables) per type.

Notes

References

External links
Official website

 
Recurring sporting events established in 1994
European Handball Federation competitions
European championships
Women's handball competitions